Connie Jean Eaves,  CorrFRSE (née Constance Halperin; born May 22, 1944), is a Canadian biologist with significant contributions to cancer and stem cell research. Eaves is a professor generics of genetics at the University of British Columbia and is also the co-founder with Allen C Eaves of Terry Fox Laboratory (Vancouver, Canada).

Education and career 
In high school, Eaves was interested in becoming a physician but later decided to pursue into research due to gender discrimination in medical school acceptance rates.

Eaves received a BA in Biology and Chemistry and in 1964 and 1966 an MSc in Biology (Genetics) working on oncogenic viruses from Queen's University. She then pursued doctoral training at the Paterson Laboratories of the Christie Hospital and Holt Radium Institute and obtained a PhD from the University of Manchester in Great Britain in 1969.

She did postdoctoral work on hematopoiesis at the Ontario Cancer Institute in Toronto, Canada, as a member of the research team of James Till and Ernest McCulloch.

After completing her studies, moved to British Columbia because she was offered an academic position at the University of British Columbia.

Her contributions to the professional and scholarly community include acting as the editor-in-chief of the journal Experimental Hematology, in addition to serving as the president of the National Cancer Institute (Canada), the associate scientific director of the Canadian Stem Cell Network, and president of the International Society of Experimental Hematology.

Honors and recognition 

 1993, Fellow of the Royal Society of Canada
 2003, Robert L. Noble Prize for Excellence in Cancer Research from the National Cancer Institute of Canada
 2008, Donald Metcalf Lecture Award by the International Society for Experimental Hematology
 2011, Canadian Blood Services' 2011 Lifetime Achievement Award.
 2015, Corresponding Fellow of the Royal Society of Edinburgh
 2016, Dr. Chew Wei Memorial Prize in Cancer Research from the University of British Columbia's Faculty of Medicine
 2018, American Society of Hematology's E. Donnall Thomas Prize
 2018, Tobias Award from the International Society for Stem Cell Research
 2019, Canada Gairdner Wightman Award
2021, Fellow of the Royal Society; Officer Order of Canada

She is also currently a Professor of Medical Genetics and an Associate Member of Medicine and Pathology & Laboratory Medicine at the University of British Columbia

References

External links
 List of publications available on PubMed

1944 births
Living people
Alumni of the University of Manchester
Canadian medical researchers
Cancer researchers
Fellows of the Royal Society of Canada
Canadian Fellows of the Royal Society
People from Ottawa
Queen's University at Kingston alumni
Stem cell researchers
Officers of the Order of Canada
Scientists from Ontario